Richard Hunt was a green anarchist activist, and editor of various environmentalist magazines, such as Green Anarchist and Alternative Green. He also contributed to early editions of Green Line. He was widely criticised in the anarchist community for his sympathies for nationalism, and wrote an editorial for Green Anarchist expressing patriotic support for British soldiers serving in the 1991 Gulf War in Iraq. Richard Hunt continued to have political disputes with the other editors of Green Anarchist, and shortly afterwards left the editorial collective to form his own magazine, entitled Alternative Green, of which he edited the first thirty-one issues and to which he contributed articles.

Hunt founded "Alternative Green" after leaving the editorial collective of Green Anarchist. According to the remaining editors of Green Anarchist, he left the collective following a conflict over what was perceived to be his nationalistic tendencies. This came to a head when Green Anarchist published an article of Hunt's that appeared to give patriotic support to Britain's role during the 1991 Gulf War. Hunt himself stated that the conflict arose when other editors wanted to move Green Anarchist's political direction further left, while Hunt wished to remain outside the left-right spectrum.

Written works
 To End Poverty: The Starvation of the Periphery by the Core
 
 Who's Starving Them?
 The Theory of Alternative Green

Further reading

References

1933 births
Living people
Anarchist writers
English anarchists
English magazine editors
English male non-fiction writers
English political writers
Green anarchists